Vanessa Zima (born December 17, 1986) is an American actress. She is known for her roles as a child actress in the 1990s films The Baby-Sitters Club, Ulee's Gold, and Wicked, and for her recurring role on the first season of the 1995 television legal drama Murder One.

Career
Zima has appeared in films such as The Baby-Sitters Club (1995), Ulee's Gold (1997), Wicked (1998), and The Brainiacs.com (2000). She has also appeared in television series such as Murder One, Family Law, Judging Amy, House, and Scandal.

Life
Zima was born in Phillipsburg, New Jersey, the daughter of Dennis and Marie. Her surname means "winter" in Polish and comes from her maternal grandfather, who was of Polish descent.

Zima has an older sister, Madeline, and a younger sister, Yvonne, both of whom are actresses.

Filmography

Awards and nominations
In 1998, Zima was nominated for a Young Artist Award for Best Performance in a Feature Film: Supporting Young Actress for Ulee's Gold (1997); the award was won by her co-star in the film, Jessica Biel.

References

External links
 

1986 births
American child actresses
American film actresses
American television actresses
Living people
American people of Polish descent
People from Phillipsburg, New Jersey
Actresses from New Jersey
20th-century American actresses
21st-century American actresses